Joshua Anasmo, is an Australian professional footballer who plays as a forward for Perth Glory. He made his professional debut in a FFA Cup playoff match against Melbourne Victory on 24 November 2021 and managed to get on the scoresheet.

References

External links

Living people
Australian soccer players
Association football forwards
Perth Glory FC players
National Premier Leagues players
Year of birth missing (living people)
Stirling Macedonia FC players